The Legend of Bagger Vance is a 2000 American sports film directed by Robert Redford, and starring Will Smith, Matt Damon and Charlize Theron. The screenplay by Jeremy Leven is based on Steven Pressfield's 1995 book The Legend of Bagger Vance: A Novel of Golf and the Game of Life. The film is set in 1931 Georgia. It was the final film starring Jack Lemmon and Lane Smith. The film was a box office bomb, grossing almost $40 million worldwideonly half of its budgetand received mixed reviews; it was criticized by several African American commentators and reviewers for employing the "Magical Negro" stereotype.

Plot 
As a senior, having had his sixth heart attack while playing golf, Hardy Greaves (Jack Lemmon) contemplates how his late wife used to ask him why he kept playing "a game that seems destined to kill" him. Explaining his love for the game, the story begins with his childhood idol: Rannulph Junuh (Matt Damon).

Junuh is the favorite son of Savannah, Georgia: a noteworthy golfer from a wealthy family; he and his beautiful girlfriend Adele Invergordon (Charlize Theron) seem to have it all. While serving as a captain in the U.S. Army during World War I, Junuh is traumatized when his entire company is wiped out in battle. Though he earns the Medal of Honor, he disappears after the war, returning to Georgia years later as a broken-down alcoholic.

At the start of the Great Depression (circa 1930), Adele is trying to recover her family's lost fortune by holding a four-round, two-day exhibition match between  Bobby Jones (Joel Gretsch) and Walter Hagen (Bruce McGill), the best golfers of the era, with a grand prize of $10,000, at the golf resort her family opened as the Depression struck. However, needing a local participant to gain local interest, a young Greaves (J. Michael Moncrief) speaks up for his hero, Junuh, prompting Adele to ask her estranged lover to play.

Junuh is approached by a mysterious traveler carrying a suitcase, who appears while he is trying to hit golf balls into the dark void of the night. The man identifies himself as Bagger Vance (Will Smith) and says he will be his caddie. With Greaves as assistant caddie, Bagger helps Junuh come to grips with his personal demons and play golf again.

When the match starts, Jones and Hagen each play well in their distinctive ways, but the disengaged Junuh plays poorly and is far behind after the first round. With Bagger caddying for him and giving advice, Junuh rediscovers his "authentic swing" in the second round and makes up some ground. In the third round, he closes the gap even more, hitting a hole in one in the process. Meanwhile, Junuh and Adele rekindle their romance.

Late in the final round, an overconfident Junuh disregards Bagger's advice at a crucial point and, after that, plays poorly. He hits a ball into a forest, which triggers a war flashback, but Bagger's words help him focus on the game. Junuh pulls back to a tie with Jones and Hagen, then has a chance to win on the final hole, but has the integrity to call a penalty on himself when his ball moves after trying to remove a loose impediment.

Seeing Junuh has grown and matured, Bagger decides that his golfer does not need him any more. With the 18th hole left unfinished, Bagger gives the position of caddie to Greaves and leaves as mysteriously as he came.

Though losing a chance to win because of the penalty, Junuh sinks an improbable putt and the match ends in a gentlemanly three-way tie. The three golfers shake hands with all of Savannah cheering. Junuh and Adele get back together.

The old Greaves wakes up and sees Bagger Vance, not aged a day, on the golf course. As Bagger beckons, Greaves follows.

Cast

Production

Background 
The plot is loosely based on the Hindu sacred text the Bhagavad Gita, part of the Hindu epic Mahabharata, where the Warrior/Hero Arjuna (R. Junuh) refuses to fight. The god Krishna appears as Bhagavan (Bagger Vance) to help him follow his path as the warrior and hero that he was meant to be. This relationship was explained by Steven J. Rosen in his 2000 book Gita on the Green: The Mystical Tradition Behind Bagger Vance, for which Pressfield wrote the foreword.

Filming 
Portions of the exhibition match were set at the Kiawah Island Golf Resort in South Carolina, United States, considered one of the toughest in the country. The scene in which Greaves has a heart attack was shot on No. 11 of the resort's Cougar Point golf course. The final hole in the film was temporary, so the filming did not interfere with the club activities, and cost US$200,000 to build. Most of the golf scenes were filmed at Colleton River Plantation, just off Hilton Head Island. Certain segments were filmed in Savannah and Jekyll Island, Georgia.

Reception

Critical response 

On Rotten Tomatoes the film has an approval rating of 43% based on reviews from 130 critics, with an average rating of 5.23/10. The website's critical consensus reads, "Despite the talent involved in The Legend of Bagger Vance, performances are hindered by an inadequate screenplay full of flat characters and bad dialogue. Also, not much happens, and some critics are offended by how the film glosses over issues of racism." On Metacritic, the film has a weighted average score of 47 out of 100, based on 35 critics, indicating "mixed or average reviews". Audiences surveyed by CinemaScore gave the film a grade B+ on scale of A to F.

Film critic Roger Ebert, who gave it 3½ stars, said, "It handles a sports movie the way Billie Holiday handled a trashy song, by finding the love and pain beneath the story. Redford and his writer, Jeremy Leven, starting from a novel by Steven Pressfield, are very clear in their minds about what they want to do. They want to explain why it is possible to devote your life to the love of golf, and they want to hint that golf and life may have a lot in common". The BBC's George Perry called it a "sumptuously photographed film" but added that "in spite of being lovely to look at, it is pretentious piffle, although Will Smith shows skill and subtlety in his ludicrous role".

Time called it one of the most "embarrassing" films of recent years for its treatment of African Americans and the use of a "Magical African-American Friend". The film would later be used by Spike Lee as an example of a film with a Magical Negro.

Box office 
The Legend of Bagger Vance opened at No. 3 at the U.S. box office behind Charlie's Angels and Meet the Parents, grossing $11,516,712 from 2,061 theaters. According to the Internet Movie Database, the film's total gross came to $30,695,227, far short of its estimated $80 million budget.

Soundtrack  
The now out-of-print soundtrack to The Legend of Bagger Vance was released on November 7, 2000. It was mostly written by Rachel Portman, except for tracks one ("My Best Wishes"), thirteen ("Bluin' the Blues") and fourteen ("Mood Indigo"), which were written by Fats Waller, Muggsy Spanier and Duke Ellington, respectively. The score for this movie was the last to be recorded at CTS Studios in Wembley, England, before the scoring stage's closure and demolition.

 Track list

 My Best Wishes (2:27)
 The Legend of Bagger Vance (2:11)
 Savannah Needs a Hero (4:53)
 Bagger Offers to Caddy for Junuh (4:07)
 Bagger & Hardy Measure the Course at Night (2:32)
 The Day of the Match Dawns (3:07)
 Birdie (1:46)
 Junuh Sees the Field (5:11)
 Hole in One (2:30)
 Junuh Comes Out of the Woods (3:55)
 Bagger Leaves (3:12)
 Old Hardy Joins Bagger by the Sea (5:50)
 Bluin' the Blues (2:27)
 Mood Indigo (3:07)
 Total soundtrack time: 47:15

See also
 List of films about angels

References

External links 

 
 
 
 
 

2000 films
2000s fantasy comedy-drama films
2000s sports comedy-drama films
20th Century Fox films
African-American comedy-drama films
American fantasy comedy-drama films
American sports comedy-drama films
Bhagavad Gita
DreamWorks Pictures films
2000s English-language films
Films based on American novels
Films directed by Robert Redford
Films produced by Michael Nozik
Films scored by Rachel Portman
Films set in 1931
Films set in Georgia (U.S. state)
Films shot in Georgia (U.S. state)
Films shot in Savannah, Georgia
Films shot in South Carolina
Golf films
Magic realism films
Films based on the Mahabharata
2000s American films
Films about angels